The 2022–23 Texas A&M–Corpus Christi Islanders men's basketball team represent Texas A&M University–Corpus Christi in the 2022–23 NCAA Division I men's basketball season as members of the Southland Conference. The Islanders are led by second-year head coach Steve Lutz.  With the exception of four games at the Dugan Wellness Center, all home games are at American Bank Center.  Both arenas are located in Corpus Christi, Texas. They finished the season 21–10, 14–4 in Southland play to finish in first place. As the No. 1 seed, they defeated McNeese and Northwestern State to win the Southland tournament for the second consecutive year. They received the conference’s automatic bid to the NCAA tournament, where, as a No. 16 seed in the Southern Region, they defeated Southeast Missouri State in the First Four before falling to overall No. 1 seed Alabama in the First Round.

Previous season
The Islanders finished the season 23–12, 7–7 in Southland play to finish in fourth place. As the No. 4 seed, they defeated Houston Baptist, Nicholls, and Southeastern to win the SLC tournament. They received the conference’s automatic bid to the 2022 NCAA Division I men's basketball tournament as a No. 16 seed in the Midwest Region, where they lost in the First Four to Texas Southern.

Preseason polls

Southland Conference Poll
The Southland Conference released its preseason poll on October 25, 2022. Receiving 11 first place votes and 149 votes overall, the Islanders were picked to finish first in the conference.

Preseason All Conference
Terrion Murdix, Isaac Mushila, and Trevian Tennyson were selected as members of the Preseason All Conference first team.  Simeon Fryer was selected as a second team member.

Roster

Schedule and results

|-
!colspan=9 style=| Non-conference Regular season

|-
!colspan=9 style=| Southland Conference Regular season

|-
!colspan=12 style=| Southland Tournament

|-
!colspan=9 style=|NCAA tournament

Source

See also
 2022–23 Texas A&M–Corpus Christi Islanders women's basketball team

References

Texas A&M–Corpus Christi Islanders men's basketball seasons
Texas AandM-Corpus Christi
Texas AandM-Corpus Christi
Texas AandM-Corpus Christi Islanders men's basketball
Texas AandM-Corpus Christi Islanders men's basketball